The women's triple jump event  at the 1995 IAAF World Indoor Championships was held on 10–11 March.

Medalists

Results

Qualification
Qualification: 13.60 (Q) or at least 12 best performers (q) qualified for the final.

Final

References

Triple
Triple jump at the World Athletics Indoor Championships
1995 in women's athletics